Christos Kontochristos (born 3 January 1991) is a Greek professional footballer who plays as a left-back for Super League 2 club Kallithea.

Club career
He started his career from the youth teams of Panionios in 2008. After two years he was given on loan to Nafpaktiakos Asteras, and Niki Volos, until 1 June 2012, when he returned to Panionios and played in 5 games in the Super League. A year later he moved to Football League club Lamia 1964, where he had (so far) his most productive season with 23 appearances. On 26 August 2014 he joined another second Division club, Panachaiki, where he played in 20 league games. On 24 July 2015, he signed with AEL Larissa F.C. On 9 September 2016, he signed a year contract with Bulgarian Bulgarian First League club Montana. Prior to his signature, Kontochristos filed an action against AEL Larissa F.C., for financial reasons of a total of €14,850 and for detraction of personality as he excluded from the summer preparation without earlier notification. Kontochristos had followed the owner of the club Alexis Kougias from his earlier club Panachaiki, asking for a contract release in order to avoid missing the end of the summer window. On 9 September 2016, has signed a contract since 31 December 2017 with Bulgarian club Montana. On 7 July 2017, Kontochristos has signed a year contract with Panegialios for an undisclosed fee. On 2 February 2018, he signed with Second League Bulgarian club Lokomotiv Sofia till the end of the 2018-19 season. On 16 August 2019, he signed with Second League Bulgarian club OFC Pirin Blagoevgrad till the end of the 2019-20 season.

International career
Kontochristos has debuted for Greece U19 National on 14 April 2010, in an International Friendly game against Serbia (1-1).

References

External links
 myplayer.gr
 epae.org
 sportgame.gr

1991 births
Living people
Greek footballers
Greek expatriate footballers
Association football defenders
Panionios F.C. players
Niki Volos F.C. players
Panachaiki F.C. players
Athlitiki Enosi Larissa F.C. players
FC Montana players
FC Lokomotiv 1929 Sofia players
OFC Pirin Blagoevgrad players
First Professional Football League (Bulgaria) players
Expatriate footballers in Bulgaria
Sportspeople from Nafpaktos